Limnonectes microdiscus is a species of frog in the family Dicroglossidae. It is endemic to Indonesia and occurs in Java and southern Sumatra.

Its natural habitats are subtropical or tropical moist lowland forest, subtropical or tropical moist montane forest, and rivers.
It is not considered threatened by the IUCN.

References

microdiscus
Amphibians of Indonesia
Endemic fauna of Java
Taxa named by Oskar Boettger
Amphibians described in 1892
Taxonomy articles created by Polbot